The 12911 / 12912 Valsad–Haridwar Superfast Express is a Superfast Express train belonging to Indian Railways – Western Railway zone that runs between  and  in India.

It operates as train number 12911 from Valsad to Haridwar Junction and as train number 12912 in the reverse direction, serving the states of Gujarat, Madhya Pradesh, Rajasthan, Uttar Pradesh, Delhi & Uttarakhand.

Coaches

The 12911 / 12 Valsad–Haridwar Superfast Express has 2 AC 2 tier, 6 AC 3 tier, 8 Sleeper class, 4 General Unreserved & 1 EOG (Seating cum luggage rake) & 1 SLR coaches. It does not carry a pantry car.

As is customary with most train services in India, coach composition may be amended at the discretion of Indian Railways depending on demand.

Service

12911 Valsad–Haridwar Superfast Express covers the distance of 1433 kilometres in 23 hours 20 mins (58.69 km/hr) & in 20 hours 55 mins as 12912 Haridwar–Valsad Superfast Express. (61.20 km/hr).

As the average speed of the train is above , as per Indian Railways rules, its fare includes a Superfast surcharge.

Route & halts

Traction

The entire route is fully electrified. It is hauled by a Vadodara-based WAP-7 (HOG)-equipped locomotive on its entire journey.

Schedule

Rake sharing

The train shares its rake with; 
 19057/19058 Udhna–Banaras Express 
 19063/19064 Udhna–Danapur Express
With PM at Valsad

References

External links
 https://www.youtube.com/watch?v=kImOTktsjEo
 https://www.youtube.com/watch?v=burjNfHXUcY

Transport in Valsad
Trains from Haridwar
Railway services introduced in 2010
Express trains in India
Rail transport in Gujarat
Rail transport in Madhya Pradesh
Rail transport in Rajasthan
Rail transport in Delhi